Housekeeping is a 1987 American comedy-drama film written and directed by Bill Forsyth, starring Christine Lahti, Sara Walker, and Andrea Burchill. Based on Marilynne Robinson's 1980 novel Housekeeping, it is about two young sisters growing up in Idaho in the 1950s. After being abandoned by their mother and raised by elderly relatives, the sisters are looked after by their eccentric aunt whose unconventional and unpredictable ways affect their lives. It was filmed on location in Alberta and British Columbia, Canada. It won two awards at the 1987 Tokyo International Film Festival.

Plot
Teen sisters Ruth and Lucille, raised by a grandmother after their mother's suicide, end up living with an aunt in a western U.S. town called Fingerbone after the grandmother dies.

Aunt Sylvie is an unusual woman. She likes to sit in the dark and sleep in the park. Others in town are never quite sure what to make of her. And the same holds true for the girls, even when Sylvie writes elaborate excuses to get them out of school.

Cast

Production
Housekeeping was the first North American film by writer and director Bill Forsyth, whose previous films—That Sinking Feeling (1979), Gregory's Girl (1981), Local Hero (1983), and Comfort and Joy (1984)—were produced in Scotland. The prospect of creating a film based on Marilynne Robinson's 1980 novel brought Forsyth to America. He later described his film as "a commercial to get people to read the novel".

When an actress friend sent Forsyth the book, he loved it. "There is in it that generational haunting that affects most of us," he said, "those familial burdens we all carry: the grandfather in the story they never knew but who seems to be there all the time."

He bought the screen rights and took two years to finance the picture. "We took it to studios who had expressed interest in it; we didn't just send it out wildly. I didn't get anywhere. I tried to work out various co-productions. At one point it was going to be a Canadian-Norwegian co-production, but that fell apart. I had some English money, but not enough."

When Diane Keaton agreed to star, Cannon Films agreed to finance. But Keaton pulled out six weeks before shooting, so Cannon withdrew as well. "That was one horrendous week," Forsyth said.

He succeeded in raising finance from David Puttnam, who produced Local Hero and who had become Columbia Pictures's head of production. Christine Lahti was signed for the lead.

Forsyth said, "I had always written the story and the script before, and therefore I was the expert on the characters. But these characters, this strange woman and those two unpredictable young girls, were up for grabs. I began to look forward to that half-hour each morning when we discussed the characters and what the day's scenes meant."

Shooting
Housekeeping was filmed in Castlegar and Nelson, British Columbia, Canada. Principal photography began September 22, 1986 and ended in December 1986.

Release
The film was released in the United States on November 25, 1987, and was also shown that month at the Regus London Film Festival. By that time, Puttnam had already been fired from Columbia, and without his support the studio gave Housekeeping minimal promotion due to its ties to the studio's ousted chairman. "People really go and see what they're told to go and see through advertising," said Forsyth in 1989, "and [Columbia] didn't spend any money advertising [Housekeeping] or promoting it because David had left by that time." When revisiting the film over 20 years later, Forsyth joked "I don't think it was released. It escaped for a bit."

The film was eventually released on VHS video in the United States on July 8, 1988. It has never been distributed in North American retail stores on either DVD or Blu-ray, but it was finally given a dual-format release in the UK by Powerhouse Films in 2017.

Critical response
Despite the lack of financial success, Housekeeping did find critical acclaim and its reputation has continued to grow despite its limited availability.

Critic Jonathan Rosenbaum rated it as a "masterpiece" for the Chicago Reader, writing that he was most impressed by Forsyth's fluidity and grace as a storyteller. Describing the story as "a kind of feminist version of Huckleberry Finn," he also praised all three of the film's main actresses and suggested that it "may have taken a Scotsman to show us the contemporary importance, the depths and radiance, of Robinson's novel."

Dave Kehr of the Chicago Tribune wrote that Forsyth had "intentionally undermined his usual whimsical style by burrowing down to the deepest assumptions and implications of its nonconformism" and applauded Forsyth for making such an "audacious departure." Similarly, Kehr also praised Lahti for delivering an "arresting performance" that was unlike the roles she had already been known for.

In his review for The New York Times, Vincent Canby described the film as a "haunting comedy about impossible attachments and doomed affection in a world divided between two kinds of people" (those who embrace random existence, and those who try to impose reason and order on random existence). Canby noted that Forsyth was able to "make us care equally" for both sisters, and called Lahti's performance "spellbinding" and "role of her film career".

In his review for the Chicago Sun-Times, Roger Ebert gave the film four out of four stars, calling it "one of the strangest and best films of the year". He felt Lahti was the perfect choice for the central role of Sylvie.

Decades later, Ebert would host a special screening of Housekeeping at his annual film festival where Forsyth and Lahti participated in a post-screening discussion. When Lahti was asked about the work she was most proud of in her career, she responded "I might be most proud of [Housekeeping], I just love it so much."

On the AllMovie website, Housekeeping has an editorial rating of four and a half out of five stars. On Rotten Tomatoes, the film holds a rating of 93% from 14 reviews.

Awards and nominations

References

External links
 
 
 

1987 films
1987 comedy-drama films
American comedy-drama films
1980s English-language films
Films directed by Bill Forsyth
Films based on American novels
Films shot in Alberta
Films shot in British Columbia
Columbia Pictures films
1980s American films